West Torrens is a single-member electoral district for the South Australian House of Assembly. Named after the City of West Torrens (which is so-named because of its location on the River Torrens), it is a 25.1 km² suburban electorate in Adelaide's west. It includes the suburbs and areas of Brooklyn Park, Cowandilla, Flinders Park, Hilton, Hindmarsh, Keswick Terminal, Marleston, Mile End, Mile End South, Netley, Richmond, Thebarton, Torrensville, Underdale and West Richmond, as well as parts of Allenby Gardens, Lockleys, Welland and West Hindmarsh.

West Torrens has had several incarnations, first as a Legislative Council district, then four times as a South Australian House of Assembly electoral district.
It was first used as district in the Legislative Council, from 1851 until 1857, with Charles Simeon Hare and then Thomas Reynolds being the members. 
From 1857 it became a House of Assembly district, returning two members until it was abolished as a name at the 1902 election. 
At the 1915 election, it was recreated as a House of Assembly seat returning two members, being abolished again at the 1938 election when single-member districts were introduced. 
In 1955 it was recreated to replace the abolished seat of Thebarton for the 1956 election, the first time that the district was represented by a single member. It was abolished at the 1970 election and replaced with the electoral district of Peake.
It reverted to its original name for the 2002 election, after a redistribution.

Members

Election results

Notes

References
 ECSA profile for West Torrens: 2018
 ABC profile for West Torrens: 2018
 Poll Bludger profile for West Torrens: 2018

Electoral districts of South Australia
1857 establishments in Australia
1902 disestablishments in Australia
1915 establishments in Australia
1938 disestablishments in Australia
1956 establishments in Australia
1970 disestablishments in Australia
2002 establishments in Australia